Love, Peace & Poetry - Vol. 6 Brazil is the sixth volume in the Love, Peace & Poetry series released by QDK Media and Normal Records in 2003. This volume explores obscuro garage rock and psychedelic rock bands from Brazil.

Track listing
 "E Assim Falava Mefistófeles" (O Bando) – 3:43
 "Tão Longe de Mim" (Os Brazões) – 2:10
 "Razão de Existir" (A Bolha) – 3:37
 "Voando" (Liverpool) – 2:09
 "Inferno No Mundo" (Bango) – 2:03
 "Birds in My Tree" (The Buttons) – 2:53
 "Lunatica" (Assim Assado) – 3:28
 "I Need You " (O Terço) – 2:23
 "Trilha Antiga" (Spectrum) – 3:18
 "Animalia" (Módulo 1000) – 1:58
 "Miragem" (Os Lobos) – 3:21
 "Quero Companheira" (Rubinho e Mauro Assumpção, Mauro Assumpção) – 2:57
 "Let's Go" (Sound Factory) – 2:32
 "Lagoa das Lontras" (O Terço) – 3:22
 "Mensageiro" (Paulo Bagunça) – 3:09
 "Marácas de Fogo" (Lula Côrtes and Zé Ramalho) – 2:28
 "Revolução Orgânica" (Marcos Valle) – 2:58
 "Quero Você, Você" (Hugo Filho) – 3:12
 "Fidelidade" (Marconi Notaro) – 3:19

References

Love, Peace & Poetry albums
2003 compilation albums
Psychedelic rock albums by Brazilian artists
Compilation albums by Brazilian artists